Roslagen Air Corps, also F 2 Hägernäs, or simply F 2, is a former Swedish Air Force air corps with the main base located on the east coast of Sweden just north of the capital Stockholm.

History
From 1919 the area was used for flight training for navy pilots.

The wing started out as the 2nd Flying Corps in 1926 with seaplanes for naval scouting and reconnaissance and bomb and torpedo attacks. In 1936 the unit was designated F 2 as an Air Force wing.

A squadron of Heinkel T 2 (He 115) served between 1939 and 1944 and another squadron of Heinkel S 12 (He 114) between 1941 and 1945.

The last operational flying squadron at F 2 consisted of Saab S 17BS reconnaissance floatplanes from 1942 to 1949 when the wing was renamed Roslagens Flygkår, Roslagen Flying Corps. The wing then became home for various other operational units in the Air Force.

The unit became home to the naval rescue unit until it moved to Svea Wing (F 8) in 1960. From 1948, the Radar School was located at F 2 and in 1959 the GCI-school also joined.

From 1951 to 1962, the Air Force Meteorology School was located here until moving to Kalmar Wing (F 12).

In 1966 the Air Force Academy for ground troops was started at F 2 and remained until 1974 when the wing was decommissioned and all schools were transferred to Södertörn Wing (F 18).

The emblem of Uppland was after decommissioning transferred to Uppland Wing (F 16).

The base area was used for general seaplane aviation until converted to a residential area in 2002. One of the hangars remained and was restored as a parking garage.

Heraldry and traditions

Coat of arms
Blazon: "Gules, the provincial badge of Uppland, a mound or, banded and ensigned with a cross-crosslet".

Colours, standards and guidons
A colour was presented to the wing on 6 June 1939 at F 8 in Barkarby by His Majesty the King Gustaf V. The colour is stored at the Swedish Army Museum in Stockholm. Blazon: "On blue cloth in the centre the badge of the Air Force; a winged two-bladed propeller under a royal crown proper. In the first corner: gules, the provincial badge of Uppland, a mound or, banded and ensigned with a cross-crosslet".

Commanding officers
1926–1929: Arthur Örnberg
1929–1932: Christer Egerström
1932–1934: Arvid Flory
1934–1936: Harald Enell
1936–1944: Herman Sundin
1944–1948: Hugo Svenow
1948–1949: Richard Weidling
1949–1957: Gösta Sandberg
1957–1970: Trygve Sjölin
1970–1971: Arne Persson
1971–1974: Klas Normelius

Names, designations and locations

See also
 Swedish Air Force
 List of military aircraft of Sweden

References

Notes

Print

Web

External links
Webpage listing all air force squadrons in Sweden

F 02
Military units and formations established in 1926
Military units and formations disestablished in 1974
1926 establishments in Sweden
1974 disestablishments in Sweden
Stockholm Garrison
Disbanded units and formations of Sweden